PF-592,379 is a drug developed by Pfizer which acts as a potent, selective and orally active agonist for the dopamine D3 receptor, which is under development as a potential medication for the treatment of female sexual dysfunction and male erectile dysfunction. Unlike some other less selective D3 agonists, a research study showed that PF-592,379 has little abuse potential in animal studies, and so was selected for further development and potentially human clinical trials.  Development has since been discontinued.

See also 
 7-OH-DPAT
 PD-128,907
 PF-219,061

References 

Dopamine agonists
Female sexual dysfunction drugs
Morpholines
Pfizer brands
Abandoned drugs
Aminopyridines
Aphrodisiacs